{{Infobox Boxingmatch
| Fight Name    = Coming With Everything
| fight date    = March 19, 2005
| image         = 
| location      = MGM Grand Garden Arena, Paradise, Nevada, U.S.
| titles        = vacant WBC International and IBA super featherweight titles
| fighter2      = Manny Pacquiao
| nickname2     = Pac-Man
| record2       = 39–2–2 (31 KO)
| hometown2     = General Santos, Philippines
|style2 = Southpaw
| height2       = 5 ft 6+1/2 in
| weight2       = 129+1/2 lbs
| recognition2  = The Ring featherweight championThe Ring No. 5 ranked pound-for-pound fighter3-division world champion
| fighter1      = Érik Morales 
| nickname1     = El Terrible("The Terrible")
| record1       = 47–2 (34 KO)
| hometown1     = Tijuana, Baja California, Mexico
| height1       = 5 ft 8 in
| weight1       = 130 lbs
|style1 = Orthodox
| recognition1  =  [[The Ring (magazine)|The Ring]] No. 8 ranked pound-for-pound fighter3-division world champion  
| result        = Morales wins via 12-round unanimous decision (115-113, 115-113, 115-113)
}}
Érik Morales vs. Manny Pacquiao, billed as Coming With Everything'', was a super featherweight boxing match. This match occurred on March 19, 2005, at the MGM Grand Garden Arena, Las Vegas, Nevada, United States and was distributed by HBO PPV. The bout is the first of the Pacquiao-Morales trilogy, widely considered one of the greatest boxing trilogies of all time.

Morales controlled the pace of the close fight. In the fifth round, Pacquiao suffered a cut over his right eye caused by Morales' right cross.

References

Morales
2005 in boxing
Boxing in Las Vegas
2005 in sports in Nevada
Boxing on HBO
March 2005 sports events in the United States
MGM Grand Garden Arena